As a nickname, Macho or El Macho may refer to:

People nicknamed Macho 

Héctor Camacho (1962–2012), Puerto Rican boxer nicknamed "Macho Camacho"
José Roberto Figueroa (born 1959), Honduran retired footballer
Machito (1908–1984), Cuban Latin jazz musician Francisco Raúl Gutiérrez Grillo 
Macho Harris (born 1986), Canadian Football League player
Orestes López (1908–1991), Cuban musician, composer and bandleader

People nicknamed El Macho 

Fernando Montero (born 1948), Costa Rican retired footballer
Rónald Mora (born 1961), Costa Rican retired footballer
Rafael Pascual (born 1970), Spanish volleyball player

See also 

 Randy Savage (1952–2011), an American professional wrestler known by the stage name "Macho Man"

Lists of people by nickname